The Leicestershire and South Derbyshire Coalfield in the English Midlands is one of the smaller British coalfields. The two areas are sometimes separately referred to as the South Derbyshire Coalfield and the Leicestershire Coalfield. All of the worked coal seams are contained within the Lower and Middle Coal Measures which are of Upper Carboniferous age.

Geology
The following seams are recognised in South Derbyshire:

Middle Coal Measures
 Ell
 Dicky Gobler
 Upper Kilburn
 Block
 Yard
 Two Foot
 Upper Cannel
 Little
 Little Kilburn

Lower Coal Measures
 Rider
 Main
 Little Woodfield
 Lower Main
 Woodfield
 Stockings
 Eureka
 Joyce's
 Upper Stanhope
 Lower Stanhope
 Well
 Twelve Inch
 Clod
 Kilburn
 Norton
 Hardbed Band
 Belperlawn

A series of seams referred to as P12, P15/16, P17, P25, P27, P31 (Derby), P33, P34 and P39/40 are recorded above the Upper Kilburn seam in the southern part of the South Derbyshire Coalfield.

In the Leicestershire area, the following are recognised;

Middle Coal Measures
 Excelsior
 Minge
 Five Foot (or Five Feet)
 Splent
 Threequarters
 New Main Rider
 New Main (Slate)
 Swannington Yard
 Cannel

Lower Coal Measures
 High Main
 Upper Main (Main)
 Smoile
 Upper Lount
 Middle Lount
 Nether Lount
 Yard
 Low Main (Roaster)
 Lower Main Upper
 Lower main Lower
 Clod
 Kilburn

References

Coal mining regions in England
Geography of Derbyshire
Geography of Leicestershire
Geology of England